The quart (symbol: qt) is an English unit of volume equal to a quarter gallon. All are roughly equal to one liter. It is divided into two pints or (in the US) four cups. Historically, the exact size of the quart has varied with the different values of gallons over time and in reference to different commodities.

Name
The term comes from the Latin  (meaning one-quarter) via the French .  However, although the French word  has the same root, it frequently means something entirely different. In Canadian French in particular, the quart is called , whilst the pint is called .

History

Since gallons of various sizes have historically been in use, the corresponding quarts have also existed with various sizes.

Definitions and equivalencies

US liquid quart
In the United States, all traditional length and volume measures have been legally standardized for commerce by the international yard and pound agreement of 1959, using the definition of 1 yard being exactly equal to 0.9144 meters. From this definition is derived the metric equivalencies for inches, feet, and miles, area measures, and measures of volume.

US dry quart 
In the United States, the dry quart is equal to one quarter of a US dry gallon, or exactly .

Imperial quart 
The imperial quart, which is used for both liquid and dry capacity, is equal to one quarter of an imperial gallon, or exactly 1.1365225 liters. In the United Kingdom goods may be sold by the quart if the equivalent metric measure is also given.

In Canadian French, by federal law, the imperial quart is called .

Winchester quart
The Winchester quart is an archaic measure, roughly equal to 2 imperial quarts or 2.25 liters.  The 2.5L bottles in which laboratory chemicals are supplied are sometimes referred to as Winchester quart bottles, although they contain slightly more than a traditional Winchester quart.

Reputed quart
The reputed quart was a measure equal to two-thirds of an imperial quart (or one-sixth of an imperial gallon), at about 0.7577liters, which is very close to one US fifth (0.757 liters).

The reputed quart was previously recognized as a standard size of wine bottle in the United Kingdom, and is only about 1% larger than the current standard wine bottle of 0.75L.

Notes

References

External links 
 
 

Alcohol measurement
Cooking weights and measures
Customary units of measurement in the United States
Imperial units
Units of volume